This is a list of all 113 Biograph films released in 1910.

Releases

References

Bibliography

Biograph Company films